The 1968 U.S. Senate election for the state of North Dakota was held November 5, 1968. The incumbent, Republican Senator Milton Young, sought and received re-election to his fifth term, defeating North Dakota Democratic-NPL Party candidate Herschel Lashkowitz, the mayor of Fargo, North Dakota since 1954.

Only Young filed as a Republican, and the endorsed Democratic candidate was Herschel Lashkowitz of Fargo, North Dakota, who was serving as the mayor of the city since 1954. Young and Lashkowitz won the primary elections for their respective parties.

One independent candidate, Duane Mutch of Larimore, North Dakota, also filed before the deadline. Mutch was later a state senator for the North Dakota Republican Party in the North Dakota Senate from 1959 to 2006 for District 19. He ran as an independent when he did not receive his party's nomination.

Election results

See also 
 1968 United States Senate elections

Notes

North Dakota
1968
1968 North Dakota elections